This is a list of current and former destinations served by Turkish low-cost airline Pegasus Airlines. This list includes destinations served by partners IZair and Pegasus Asia.

The list includes the city, country, the codes of the International Air Transport Association (IATA airport code) and the International Civil Aviation Organization (ICAO airport code), and the airport's name, with the airline's hubs marked. The list also contains the beginning and end year of services, with destinations marked if the services was not continual and if they are seasonal, and for dates which occur in the future (as of January 2017).

List

References

Annotations 

Lists of airline destinations
Pegasus Airlines